Jason Stoltenberg (born 4 April 1970) is an Australian former professional tennis player.

Tennis career
Stoltenberg began playing tennis at age ten on an antbed (crushed termite mound) court where his father owned a cotton farm in the Far West (the bush) of New South Wales. He was an Australian Institute of Sport scholarship holder. He is married to former Czechoslovakian player Andrea Strnadová.

Juniors
In 1987, he won the Boys' Singles title at the Australian Open and was ranked the No. 1 junior player in the world. He turned professional later that year.

Pro tour
Stoltenberg reached his first tour singles final in 1989 at Livingston, New Jersey and won his first top-level title in 1993 at Manchester. He was also part of the Australian team which finished runners-up in that year's Davis Cup, losing in the final to Germany.

Stoltenberg's best performance at a Grand Slam event came in 1996, when he reached the semi finals at Wimbledon, defeating Adrian Voinea, Jiří Novák, Mosé Navarra, Jakob Hlasek and Goran Ivanišević in the quarter finals, before being knocked-out by eventual champion Richard Krajicek.

During his career, Stoltenberg won four top-level singles titles and five doubles titles. His career-high rankings were World No. 19 in singles and No. 23 in doubles. His career prize money totalled US$3,305,212. His last singles title came in 1997 at Coral Springs, Florida. He retired from the professional tour in 2001.

Coaching career
Stoltenberg was the coach of Lleyton Hewitt from December 2001 until June 2003. He resigned as Hewitt's coach after Hewitt lost to Tommy Robredo at the 2003 French Open.

ATP career finals

Singles: 13 (4 titles, 9 runner-ups)

Doubles: 11 (5 titles, 6 runner-ups)

ATP Challenger and ITF Futures finals

Singles: 3 (3–0)

Doubles: 3 (1–2)

Junior Grand Slam finals

Singles: 3 (1 title, 2 runner-ups)

Doubles: 5 (5 titles)

Performance timelines

Singles

Doubles

Mixed doubles

References

External links 
 
 
 
 

Australian male tennis players
Australian Open (tennis) junior champions
Australian tennis coaches
French Open junior champions
People from the North West Slopes
Tennis players at the 1996 Summer Olympics
Wimbledon junior champions
1970 births
Living people
Australian people of German descent
Australian Institute of Sport tennis players
Olympic tennis players of Australia
Tennis people from New South Wales
Grand Slam (tennis) champions in boys' singles
Grand Slam (tennis) champions in boys' doubles